Maitland Stewart McCarthy (February 5, 1872 – May 17, 1930) was a politician, lawyer and judge from western Canada.

Born in Orangeville, Ontario, he was the son of Thomas Anthony Maitland McCarthy, a county court judge, and Jennie Frances Stewart. He studied at Trinity College School in Port Hope and Trinity University, receiving a LLB in 1896. He was called to the Ontario bar in 1897 and set up practice in Sarnia.

Marriage/Relocation
In 1900, he married Eva Florence Watson. McCarthy moved to Calgary, then part of the Northwest Territories, in 1903. He was admitted to the bar and set up practice in Calgary with William L. Walsh.

Politics
Maitland was elected Calgary's first direct member of the House of Commons of Canada after the redistribution prior to the 1904 federal election gave Calgary its first direct seat. He was re-elected to a second term in the 1908 Canadian federal election.

Maitland was offered leadership of the provincial Conservative Party prior to the 1909 Alberta general election, but declined the offer of leadership as he would have to resign his federal seat which he won in a controversial election in 1908, and felt the resignation would be seen as an admission of guilt.

Electoral record

Post-politics
After leaving politics, he returned to the practice of law. McCarthy was named King's Counsel in 1913 and, in 1914, he was appointed to the Supreme Court of Alberta. In 1926, he retired from the bench due to health problems.

Death
McCarthy died while on vacation in Montreal in 1930, aged 58.

References 

Works cited

External links
 
 

1872 births
1930 deaths
Judges in Alberta
Conservative Party of Canada (1867–1942) MPs
Members of the House of Commons of Canada from Alberta
Members of the House of Commons of Canada from the Northwest Territories
People from Orangeville, Ontario
Politicians from Calgary
Canadian King's Counsel